The City of Warwick was a local government area administering the regional centre of Warwick in the Darling Downs region of Queensland.

History
The Borough of Warwick came into being on 25 May 1861 under the Municipalities Act 1858, a piece of New South Wales legislation inherited by Queensland at its separation two years earlier.

With the passage of the Local Authorities Act 1902, the Borough of Warwick became the Town of Warwick.

On 4 April 1936 it was proclaimed as the City of Warwick.

On 19 March 1992, the Electoral and Administrative Review Commission, created two years earlier, produced its report External Boundaries of Local Authorities, and recommended that local government boundaries in the Warwick area be rationalised into 3 new local government areas.  That recommendation was not implemented, but the outcome was that the City of Warwick was merged with the Shires of Allora, Glengallan and Rosenthal to form a new Shire of Warwick. The Local Government (Allora, Glengallan, Rosenthal and Warwick) Regulation 1994 was gazetted on 20 May 1994. On 25 June, an election was held for the new council, and on 1 July 1994, the City of Warwick was abolished.

Mayors
 1861-1862: James Jones Kingsford
 1863: Thomas McEvoy
 1864: William Marshall
 1865: S. W. Alfred
 1866: Thomas McEvoy
 1866-1867 James Morgan, father of Arthur Morgan (mayor 1886-1889 and Premier of Queensland)
 1868: John Liddell Ross
 1869: Edmund L. Thornton
 1870 John Liddell Ross
 1871-1872: Samuel Evenden
 1873-1874: John Liddell Ross
 1875: Frederick Morgan
 1876: Frederick Hudson
 1876-1877: Jacob Horwitz, Member of the Queensland Legislative Assembly for Warwick
 1878: John W. Quinn
 1879-1880: James M'Keachie
 1881-1884: Thomas Alexander Johnson, Member of the Queensland Legislative Council and father of W.G. Johnson (mayor in 1912)
 1885: W.D. Wilson
 1886-1889: Arthur Morgan, Member of the Queensland Legislative Assembly for Warwick, Member of the Queensland Legislative Council, Premier of Queensland
 1890: John Archibald, also Member of the Queensland Legislative Council
 1891: John Healy, a council member for 33 years and father of John Healy, Member of the Queensland Legislative Assembly for Warwick
 1892: Francis Grayson, also Member of the Queensland Legislative Assembly for Cunningham
 1893: William Morgan
 1894: William Collins
 1895: Jeremiah Allman, father of John Allman (mayor in 1933)
 1896: Francis Grayson (2nd term)
 1897: John Archibald (2nd term)
 1898: Arthur Morgan (2nd term)
 1899: William Wallace
 1900-1901: William Morgan
 1902: Jeremiah Allman (2nd term)
 1903: C.B. Daveney
 1904: Francis Grayson (3rd term)
 1905: J.D. Connellan
 1906: J.S. Morgan
 1907: B.T. De Conlay
 1908-1909: R.J. Shilliday
 1910: Daniel Connolly
 1911: John Healy (2nd term)
 1912: W.G. Johnson, son of Thomas Alexander Johnson (MLC and mayor in 1881-1884)
 1913: John Allman
 1914: John Lamb
 1915: John Anderson
 1916: D.J. Hutchings
 1917-1918: John W. Gilham
 1919: A.P. Jutsum
 1920: R.E. Gillam
 1921-1923: John Anderson
 1924: Daniel Connolly
 1927: Daniel Connolly
 1933-1936: John Allman, son of Jeremiah Allman (mayor in 1895)
 1988: Stanley Richard Walsh

Town clerks 
 1861: Edward Jones
 1861: C. F. Bell
 1861-1863 :John Oxenham
 1863-1865: George Kennedy
 1865-1868: J. M. Garrett
 1868-1903: F. B. Woods
 1903-1916: J. Spreadborough

Population

References

External links
 
 Local Government (Allora, Glengallan, Rosenthal and Warwick) Regulation 1994

Former local government areas of Queensland
Warwick, Queensland
1861 establishments in Australia
1994 disestablishments in Australia